Lauren Jennifer King (born 1982) is an American attorney and judge who is a United States district judge of the United States District Court for the Western District of Washington.

Early life and education 

King was born in Oklahoma City. She earned a Bachelor of Arts from the University of Washington in 2004 and a Juris Doctor from the University of Virginia School of Law in 2008. King is a citizen of the Muscogee (Creek) Nation.

Career 

King was an associate at K&L Gates from 2008 to 2009 and  Byrnes Keller Cromwel from 2010 to 2012. She was a principal at Foster Garvey, P.C. based in Seattle, Washington, where she practiced from 2012 to 2021. She served as a pro tem appellate judge for the Northwest Intertribal Court System from 2013 to 2021. She was also appointed as a commissioner on the Washington State Gambling Commission. She previously taught Federal Indian Law at the Seattle University School of Law.

Federal judicial service 

On March 30, 2021, President Joe Biden nominated King to serve as a United States district judge of the United States District Court for the Western District of Washington to the seat vacated by Judge Robert S. Lasnik, who assumed senior status on January 27, 2016. On June 9, 2021, a hearing on her nomination was held before the Senate Judiciary Committee. On July 15, 2021, her nomination was reported out of committee by a 13–9 vote. On October 5, 2021, the United States Senate invoked cloture on her nomination by a 55–44 vote. Her nomination was confirmed later that day by a 55–44 vote. She received her judicial commission on December 7, 2021. She is the first Native-American federal judge to serve in Washington State. As of October 2022, she is the seventh overall Native American federal judge in the United States, and the fifth serving on the bench.

See also
List of Native American jurists

References

External links 

1982 births
Living people
21st-century American women lawyers
21st-century American judges
21st-century American lawyers
21st-century Native Americans
21st-century Native American women
21st-century American women judges
Judges of the United States District Court for the Western District of Washington
Lawyers from Oklahoma City
Muscogee (Creek) Nation people
Native American judges
Native American lawyers
Oklahoma lawyers
Puyallup Tribe people
Seattle University faculty
United States district court judges appointed by Joe Biden
University of Virginia School of Law alumni
University of Washington alumni
Washington (state) lawyers